The Macmillan Ways are a network of long-distance footpaths in England that link points on the Bristol Channel, English Channel and North Sea. They are promoted to raise money for Macmillan Cancer Relief, a charity. 
The Macmillan Ways are: 

The Macmillan Way - Abbotsbury in Dorset to Boston, Lincolnshire ;
The Macmillan Way West from Castle Cary in Somerset to Barnstaple in Devon,  (Boston to Barnstaple is );
The Macmillan Cross Cotswold Pathway from Banbury to Bath, mostly on the main Macmillan Way;
The Cotswold Link,  from Banbury to Chipping Campden where it links to the Cotswold Way National Trail
The Cross Britain Way,  from Barmouth to Boston across Wales and England, launched in 2014

See also 
 List of long-distance footpaths in the United Kingdom

External links 

Long-distance footpaths in England
Macmillan Ways
Macmillan Ways